Record Review (radio programme) refers to a radio programme on BBC Radio 3. It may also refer to:

Hi-Fi News & Record Review - a British magazine.
International Record Review - an independent British magazine.
Music criticism